Amin may refer to:

People
 Amin (name), a masculine given name and also a surname
 Al-Amin, the sixth Abbasid caliph, who ruled from 809 to 813
 Amin (Qing dynasty), an Imperial Prince of the Qing Dynasty
 Amin, an arbitrator who assessed and collected revenue in the Parganas

Other uses
 Amin, Kurukshetra, now known as Abhimanyupur, a village in Haryana state, India
 AMIN, or Anak Mindanao, a political party in the Philippines
 "Amin" (song), a song by Anna Vissi
 AMIN Worldwide, an alliance of independently owned advertising agencies
 Amin (film), a 2018 French drama film
 Amen in religion

See also
 Amine (disambiguation)
 Amen (disambiguation)
 Aming (J-pop), a Japanese singing duo popular in the early 1980s, known for their song "Matsuwa"
 "Amin, Amin, ya Rabaljalil", the anthem for Perlis, a state in Malaysia